In mathematics, the Schur orthogonality relations, which were proven by Issai Schur through Schur's lemma, express a central fact about representations of finite groups. 
They admit a generalization to the case of compact groups in general, and in particular compact Lie groups, such as the rotation group SO(3).

Finite groups

Intrinsic statement
The space of complex-valued class functions of a finite group G has a natural inner product:

With respect to this inner product, the irreducible characters form an orthonormal basis
for the space of class functions, and this yields the orthogonality relation for the rows of the character
table:

For , applying the same inner product to the columns of the character table yields:

The orthogonality relations can aid many computations including:
 decomposing an unknown character as a linear combination of irreducible characters;
 constructing the complete character table when only some of the irreducible characters are known;
 finding the orders of the centralizers of representatives of the conjugacy classes of a group; and 
 finding the order of the group.

Coordinates statement
Let  be a matrix element of an irreducible matrix representation
 of a finite group   of order  |G|, i.e. G has |G| elements. Since it can be proven that any matrix representation of any finite group is equivalent to a unitary representation, we assume  is unitary:

where  is the (finite) dimension of the irreducible representation .

The orthogonality relations, only valid for matrix elements of irreducible representations, are:

The Kronecker delta  is unity if the matrices are in the same irreducible representation .
it is zero. The other two Kronecker delta's state that  
the row and column indices must be equal ( and ) in order to obtain a non-vanishing result.  This theorem is also known as the Great (or Grand) Orthogonality Theorem.

Every group has an identity representation (all group elements mapped onto the real number 1).
This is an irreducible representation. The great orthogonality relations immediately imply that 

Example of the permutation group on 3 objects

The 3! permutations of three objects form a group of order 6, commonly denoted  (symmetric group). This group is isomorphic to the point group , consisting of a threefold rotation axis and three vertical mirror planes. The groups have a 2-dimensional irreducible representation (l = 2). In the case of  one usually labels this representation
by the Young tableau  and in the case of 
one usually writes  . In both cases the representation consists of the following six real matrices, each representing a single group element:

The normalization of the (1,1) element:

In the same manner one can show the normalization of the other matrix elements: (2,2), (1,2), and (2,1).
The orthogonality of the (1,1) and (2,2)  elements:

Similar relations hold for the orthogonality of the elements (1,1) and (1,2), etc.
One verifies easily in the example that all sums of corresponding matrix elements vanish because of
the orthogonality of the given irreducible representation to the identity representation.

Direct implications
The trace of a matrix is a sum of diagonal matrix elements,

The collection of traces is the character  of a representation. Often one writes for
the trace of a matrix in an irreducible representation with character  

In this notation we can write several character formulas:

which allows us to check whether or not a representation is irreducible. (The formula means that the lines in any character table have to be orthogonal vectors.)
And

which helps us to determine how often the irreducible representation  is contained within the reducible representation  with character .

For instance, if
 

and  the order of the group is

then the number of times that  is contained within the given
reducible representation  is

See Character theory for more about group characters.

Compact Groups
The generalization of the orthogonality relations from finite groups to compact groups (which include compact Lie groups such as SO(3)) is basically simple: Replace the summation over the group by an integration over the group.

Every compact group  has unique bi-invariant Haar measure, so that the volume of the group is 1. The orthogonality relations can then be stated in two parts:

1) If  then

2) If  is an orthonormal basis of the representation space  then
 
These orthogonality relations and the fact that all of the representations have finite dimensions are consequences of the Peter–Weyl theorem.

An Example SO(3)

An example of an r = 3 parameter group is the matrix group SO(3) consisting of all 3 x 3 orthogonal matrices with unit determinant. A possible parametrization of this group is in terms of Euler angles:  (see e.g., this article for the explicit form of an element of SO(3) in terms of Euler angles).

Not only the recipe for the computation of the volume element  depends on the chosen parameters, but also the final result, i.e. the analytic form of the weight function (measure) .

For instance, the Euler angle parametrization of SO(3) gives the weight  while the n, ψ parametrization gives the weight 
with 

It can be shown that the irreducible matrix representations of compact Lie groups are finite-dimensional and can be chosen to be unitary:

With the shorthand notation

the orthogonality relations take the form

with the volume of the group:

As an example we note that the irreducible representations of SO(3) are Wigner D-matrices , which are of dimension . Since

they satisfy

Notes

References 
Any physically or chemically oriented book on group theory mentions the orthogonality relations. The following more advanced books give the proofs:
 M. Hamermesh, Group Theory and its Applications to Physical Problems, Addison-Wesley, Reading (1962). (Reprinted by Dover).
 W. Miller, Jr., Symmetry Groups and their Applications, Academic Press, New York (1972). 
 J. F. Cornwell, Group Theory in Physics, (Three volumes), Volume 1, Academic Press, New York (1997).
The following books give more mathematically inclined treatments:
 
 
Representation theory of groups